Deer Creek Township is the name of three townships in the U.S. state of Indiana:

 Deer Creek Township, Carroll County, Indiana
 Deer Creek Township, Cass County, Indiana
 Deer Creek Township, Miami County, Indiana

See also
Deer Creek Township (disambiguation)

Indiana township disambiguation pages